Portrait of Barbara van Vlaendenbergh is small c 1470–72 oil on wood painting by Hans Memling in the Royal Museums of Fine Arts of Belgium. She is shown in three quarters profile with her hands clasped in prayer, and wears a small black hennin with a transparent veil. Her hair is tightly pulled back, and shaved above the forehead. Van Vlaendenbergh is positioned before a landscape framed by an open window.

Notes

Sources

 Panofsky, Erwin. Early Netherlandish Painting. London: HarperCollins, 1953. 
 De Vos, Dirk. Hans Memling: The Complete Works. Ghent: Harry N Abrams, 1994. 

1470s paintings
Van Vlaendenbergh
Van Vlaendenbergh